Ian Kennedy Martin (born 23 May 1936) is a British television scriptwriter who created the action drama series The Sweeney (1975–1978).

Career 
He began his television career in the 1960s, first as a script editor on the military police drama series Redcap (1964) and then later as a writer on series such as The Troubleshooters (1965). In 1971 he worked on the popular BBC drama series The Onedin Line, which ran for nine years until 1980. 

He also wrote the 1974 drama series The Capone Investment. He is best known for creating the popular police action drama series The Sweeney, produced by Euston Films for Thames Television, which ran on the ITV network from 1975 to 1978. It also spawned two feature film spin-offs. He is also known for writing the 1975 action film Mitchell.

Since the end of The Sweeney in 1978, Kennedy Martin has continued to write for various police and detective dramas. These have included the BBC's Juliet Bravo and The Chinese Detective during the 1980s and ITV's The Knock in the 1990s. 

Martin has also written a number of novels, including Rekill and the dystopian science fiction novel The Last Crime, this last under the pseudonym John Domatilla.  On 9 March 2009, his first play, The Berlin Hanover Express premiered at the Hampstead Theatre in North London.

Personal life
He is the younger brother of the scriptwriter Troy Kennedy Martin (Z-Cars, Edge of Darkness), with whom he worked on Redcap.

Filmography
 Mitchell (1975)
 Sweeney 2 - creator credit only (1978)

References

External links
Official website 

1936 births
British television writers
Living people
British male novelists